William Rupert James Donkin (born 26 December 2000) is a professional footballer who plays as a midfielder for Chinese Super League side Shenzhen. Born in England, he represents the Chinese Taipei national team.

Career
Donkin was born in Oxford to an English father and a Taiwanese mother. He lived in Amsterdam at a young age. He went to school at Eton College and played for the school Association 1st XI at the age of only fifteen. During his time at Eton he represented England Independent Schools (ISFA) at Under-14, Under-15 and Under-16 level.

At the age of nine he was scouted by Barnet's academy, before signing for Chelsea at the age of eleven. He played for the Chelsea Academy for five years, winning numerous honours including the Premier League Under-15 International Tournament where he scored in the final during a 2–1 victory over Manchester City.

In March 2017, he was signed by Crystal Palace to play in their Under-18 team, where he helped the side win the southern league in his first season. On 28 September 2019, he signed for Stabæk Fotball in the Norwegian Eliteserien, although he will be ineligible to play for the first team until 1 January 2020.

In September 2020, Donkin joined Maltese Premier League side Balzan on a one-year deal. After making only three substitute appearances for Balzan, Donkin was loaned to fellow Maltese Premier League side Mosta until the end of the season. On 6 March 2021, Donkin scored his first professional goal in a 5–1 victory over Senglea Athletic.

On 31 August 2022, Donkin completed a move to Chinese Super League side Shenzhen.

International career

Youth

On 7 October 2018, he was named in the under-19 side for the 2018 AFC U-19 Championship. He played every minute of Chinese Taipei's campaign at the tournament, which ended with them eliminated in last place in their group.

Senior

In October 2017 it emerged that Taiwan head coach Gary White was seeking European based players with Taiwanese heritage to represent the team, having also called up Ross County midfielder Tim Chow. In November, it was announced that Donkin had also been called up after impressing for the national under-19 team during training. He made his debut at the age of 16 as an 85th-minute substitute  but could not prevent Taiwan from being eliminated from Asian Cup qualification at the hands of Turkmenistan. He returned to the national team in December for the 2017 CTFA International Tournament, earning plaudits as he appeared from the bench in all 3 games, overall assisting 2 goals and hitting the crossbar in his performances.

In November 2018, he was named in the Chinese Taipei side for the 2019 EAFF E-1 Football Championship second round.

Taiwanese fans have nicknamed Donkin "Doughtnut Boy" due to how his surname translates into Mandarin.

Career statistics

International appearances

References

External links
 

2000 births
Living people
English footballers
People with acquired Taiwanese citizenship
Taiwanese footballers
Taiwanese expatriate footballers
Chinese Taipei international footballers
Sportspeople of Chinese descent
Association football midfielders
English people of Taiwanese descent
Taiwanese people of English descent
People educated at Eton College
Footballers from Oxford
Stabæk Fotball players
Balzan F.C. players
Maltese Premier League players
Expatriate footballers in Norway
Expatriate footballers in Malta
English expatriate sportspeople in Norway
English expatriate sportspeople in Malta
Shenzhen F.C. players
Chinese Super League players
Expatriate footballers in China
English expatriate sportspeople in China